A home movie is a film made by amateurs.

Home Movie or Home Movies may also refer to:

 Home video, films or television shows rented or sold in a video format for home use, or amateur video recordings, or the technology of home video recording and reproduction generally
 Home Movie (2008 film), a horror film
 Home Movie (2013 film), a short documentary biographical film
 Home Movie: The Princess Bride, a 2020 celebrity "fan remake" of the 1987 film The Princess Bride
 Home Movies (TV series), a 1999–2004 cartoon television program
 Home Movies (film), a 1980 film directed by Brian De Palma
 Home Movies (musical), a 1964 "Off-Off-Broadway" musical scored by Al Carmines
 Home Movies (video), a 1995 music video by Pennywise
 Home Movies (album), The Best of Everything But the Girl 2001
Home Movies, a 1997 novel by Ray Robertson